Vangueriopsis rubiginosa is a species of flowering plants in the family Rubiaceae.

It is found in Cabinda, Cameroon, the Republic of the Congo, Equatorial Guinea, and the Democratic Republic of the Congo.

References 

rub